The 2017–18 UCI Track Cycling World Cup (also known as the Tissot UCI Track Cycling World Cup for sponsorship reasons) was a multi-race tournament over a track cycling season. It was the 26th series of the UCI Track Cycling World Cup organised by the UCI. The series was run from 3 November 2017 to 21 January 2018 and consisted of five rounds.

Series 
On 11 May 2017 the UCI revealed the location and dates of the world cup meetings that took place in 2017. Four rounds took place in Pruszków, Poland, Manchester, Great Britain, Milton, Canada and Santiago, Chile. On 27 June 2017 the UCI expanded the World Cup to five events by adding Minsk, Belarus to the schedule for a round to take place in 2018. All venues except Manchester are hosting a round of the World Cup for the first time.

Pruszków, Poland
The first round was hosted in Pruszków. The racing was held on three full days between 3 and 5 November 2017 at the BGŻ BNP Paribas Arena. The venue hosted junior and under 23 European Championships in 2008, the World Championships in 2009 and the UEC European Track Cycling Championships in 2010.

Manchester, Great Britain 
The second round was hosted in Manchester in Great Britain. This round was held between 10 and 12 November 2017 at HSBC UK National Cycling Centre. Manchester has previously hosted the 2002 Commonwealth Games, the 1996, 2000 and 2008 World Championships and seven times has hosted a round of the world cup. This will be the first time since 2013 that the venue has hosted this event.

Milton, Canada 
The third round was hosted in Milton. The racing was held on three full days between 1 and 3 December 2017 at the Mattamy National Cycling Centre. The venue was built for the 2015 Pan and Parapan American Games held in Toronto.

Santiago, Chile 
The penultimate round of this World Cup season was hosted in Santiago. This round was held between 8 and 10 December 2017 at the Parque Peñalolén velodrome. The venue was host to the 2014 South American Games

Minsk, Belarus
The final round of the world cup took place at the Velodrome Minsk-Arena. The venue hosted the 2009 European Championships and the World Championships in 2013.

Format
The following events will be raced at all rounds:
 Individual sprint, men and women
 Team sprint, men and women
 Keirin, men and women
 Team pursuit, men and women
 Madison, men and women
 Omnium, men and women

At the Purszkow round the points race, Scratch race events were included for both sexes and the women were additionally race the individual pursuit. The women also competed in the 500m Time Trial in Manchester and both sexes competed in the Scratch race. In the Milton round the points race was additionally held for both sexes. At the final round in Minsk the Scratch and points races were added to the schedule for both sexes; while the men were additionally race the individual pursuit.

On 2 November the UCI announced that the top three riders across the series in individual sprint, keirin, Omnium and Madison races received an additional bonus to their prize money.

The top three series bonus is:
 Winners of the final overall ranking: CHF 10,000
 2nd in the final overall ranking: CHF 6,000
 3rd in the final overall ranking: CHF 2,000.

The top three of each individual race during the series received in Euros, 625, 375, 250 respectively. The podium places of the team pursuit received in Euros 1250, 750, 500, for first, second and third place. Each pair in the Madison who finish in the top three received in Euros, 625, 375, 250 respectively. In the men's team sprint each time received in Euros 940, 560 and 375, while the women's team sprint received €625, 375 and 250 for a top three finish.

Standings

Men

Sprint

Team Sprint

Team Pursuit

Pursuit

Madison

Omnium

Keirin

Scratch Race

Points Race

1Km Time Trial

Women

Sprint

Team Sprint

Team Pursuit

500m Time Trial

Madison

Omnium

Keirin

Scratch Race

Points Race

Pursuit

Overall Team Standings 
Overall team standings are calculated based on total number of points gained by the team's riders in each event.

Results

Men

Women

References 

UCI Track Cycling World Cup
World Cup
World Cup
UCI Track Cycling World Cup
UCI Track Cycling World Cup
UCI Track Cycling World Cup
UCI Track Cycling World Cup
UCI Track Cycling World Cup